Jean-Baptiste Horn (7 March 1886 – 26 November 1957) was a Luxembourgian gymnast who competed in the 1912 Summer Olympics. In 1912 he was a member of the Luxembourgian team which finished fourth in the team, European system competition and fifth in the team, free system event.

References

External links
 list of Luxembourgian gymnasts 
 Jean-Baptiste Horn's profile at Sports Reference.com

1886 births
1957 deaths
Luxembourgian male artistic gymnasts
Olympic gymnasts of Luxembourg
Gymnasts at the 1912 Summer Olympics
20th-century Luxembourgian people